Hrad may refer to:

 Hrad (castle), meaning "castle" in Czech and Slovak
 Hrad (politics), in the politics of Czechoslovakia and later the Czech Republic
 Hrad (toponymy), a Czech toponym
 Prague Castle
 Hrad (film), a Bengali film